The Tutts are a five-piece New Zealand rock band who, on the 21 November 2006, released their first single, titled "K". The song "K" is featured on C4, a New Zealand music television station, as the C4 "theme song". Also featured on the CD single is "WhiteOut", the Tutts second single. "K" reached number 19 on the New Zealand Singles Chart. 

There has also been a music video produced, which was funded by New Zealand On Air, and features on C4's music television programme, "Select Live". The video can be found here . This video won the "Best Breakthrough Video" award, in the 2006 Juice TV (another New Zealand music television station) Awards. The Tutts were also invited to perform "K" at the 2006 New Zealand Music Awards. The Tutts have performed "K" at the Big Day Out 2006-07.

2006 singles